The Diocese of Memphis is a Latin Church ecclesiastical territory or diocese of the Catholic Church consisting of the counties of Tennessee to the west of the Tennessee River.  The diocese is split into two deaneries.  The Memphis Deanery encompasses twenty-eight (28) parishes in Shelby County.  The Jackson Deanery encompasses fourteen (14) parishes and five (5) missions in the other 20 counties in the diocese. The diocesan cathedral is the Cathedral of the Immaculate Conception in Memphis. The Diocese of Memphis is a suffragan diocese in the ecclesiastical province of the metropolitan Archdiocese of Louisville.

History
Pope Paul VI erected the Diocese of Memphis on 20 June 1970, taking its present territory from the Diocese of Nashville and making it a suffragan of the metropolitan Archdiocese of Louisville.

Reports of sexual abuse
In 2007, Diocese of Memphis settled three sex abuse lawsuits. In 2010, unsealed court documents revealed that at least 15 Catholic clergy who served in the Diocese of Memphis were accused of committing acts of sex abuse and that $2 million was secretly paid to one of these sex abuse victims. On February 19, 2020, it was revealed former Memphis Bishop Carroll Dozier was accused of committing acts of sex abuse in Diocese of Richmond before he was transferred to the Diocese of Memphis. In September 2019, the Richmond sex abuse accusations resulted in Dozier's image being removed the city of Memphis' "Upstanders Mural", located on a wall across from the National Civil Rights Museum. On February 28, 2020, the Diocese of Memphis released a list of 20 Catholic clergy who were credibly accused of sexually abusing children while serving in the Diocese.

Tenure and removal of Bishop Martin Holley

Pope Francis named Martin Holley Bishop of Memphis, on August 23, 2016, and he was installed as bishop on October 19, 2016.

Holley transferred about 75% of the pastors in the diocese within a few months of becoming bishop, first requesting their resignations and giving them the title "parochial administrator" rather than "pastor" of the same parish so he could transfer them without their resignation. He also appointed a Canadian priest, Msgr. Clement J. Machado, SOLT to three diocesan offices: vicar general, moderator of the curia and diocesan chancellor. In January 2018, citing lack of funds, the diocese announced the closure of the ten schools in its network of Memphis Jubilee Catholic Schools, founded in 1999 to serve children from poor families.  These actions brought considerable dissention among the clergy of the diocese.  In June 2018, the Vatican sent Archbishops Wilton Gregory of Atlanta and Bernard Hebda of St. Paul-Minneapolis to conduct a visitation of the Memphis diocese, with specific direction to investigate complaints about Holley's leadership. They met with several dozen priests. Machado resigned from the diocese shortly after Gregory and Hebda completed their visitation and Holley assigned a different priest to each of the three offices Machado had held.

On October 24, 2018, Pope Francis removed Holley as bishop, citing concerns about his reassignment policy, and named Archbishop Joseph Kurtz of Louisville Apostolic Administrator. The following day, Holley said to Catholic News Agency that he believed he was removed as "revenge" for advising Pope Benedict XVI against appointing Cardinal Donald Wuerl, under whom Holley served as Auxiliary Bishop of Washington, for the job of Vatican Secretary of State in 2012.

On March 5, 2019, the Vatican announced the appointment of Bishop David Prescott Talley to Holley's former post. Bishop Talley was the Bishop of Alexandria, Louisiana.

Bishops

Bishops of Memphis
 Carroll Thomas Dozier (1970–1982)
 James Francis Stafford (1982–1986), appointed Archbishop of Denver and later President of the Pontifical Council for the Laity and Major Penitentiary of the Apostolic Penitentiary (elevated to Cardinal in 1998)
 Daniel M. Buechlein, O.S.B. (1987–1992), appointed Archbishop of Indianapolis
 J. Terry Steib, S.V.D. (1993–2016)
 Martin David Holley (2016–2018), removed by Pope Francis  - Joseph Edward Kurtz, Archbishop of Louisville (apostolic administrator, 2018–2019)
 David Talley (2019–present)

Other priests of this diocese who became bishops
Robert W. Marshall, appointed Bishop of Alexandria in Louisiana in 2020
 James Peter Sartain, appointed Bishop of Little Rock in 2000 and later Bishop of Joliet in Illinois and Archbishop of Seattle

Education
There is one Catholic University within the geographic boundaries of the Diocese:
 Christian Brothers University (CBU), Memphis
There are a total of 28 primary and secondary schools with a total of more than 8000 students. The High Schools include:
 Christian Brothers High School, Memphis
 Immaculate Conception Cathedral High School, Memphis
 St. Agnes Academy-St. Dominic School, Memphis
 Saint Benedict at Auburndale High School, Cordova (Memphis)
 Sacred Heart of Jesus High School*, Jackson

 * Operates independently and with the blessing of the Bishop.

Closed schools
 Bishop Byrne High School, Memphis
 Memphis Catholic High School, Memphis

See also

 Catholic Church by country
 Catholic Church hierarchy
 List of the Catholic dioceses of the United States

References

Arms

Notes

External links 
Roman Catholic Diocese of Memphis Official Site

 
Christianity in Tennessee
Christian organizations established in 1970
Catholic Church in Tennessee
Memphis
Memphis
Roman Catholic Ecclesiastical Province of Louisville
1970 establishments in Tennessee
Organizations based in Memphis, Tennessee